Wan Zaman bin Wan Mustapha (born 12 June 1983 in Kota Bharu, Kelantan) is a Malaysian footballer who plays as a midfielder for PDRM recently transfer from Kelantan FA in Malaysia Super League.

References

External links
 

1983 births
Living people
Malaysian footballers
Kelantan FA players
People from Kota Bharu
People from Kelantan
Malaysian people of Malay descent
Association football midfielders